GH2 may refer to:

 Green hydrogen
 Growth hormone 2
 Guam Highway 2 (GH-2)
 Guitar Hero II
 Hill GH2, a Formula one car (1975–1976)
 A series of Panasonic cameras, see Panasonic Lumix DMC-GH2